Eric Werner (born January 26, 1983) is a retired American ice hockey defenseman. He is a 3-time NCAA champion with Michigan, a 1-time EIHL champion with the Nottingham Panthers, and a 1-time SIHL champion with Jesenice.

Career statistics

Awards and honours

References

External links
 

1983 births
Living people
People from Grosse Pointe Woods, Michigan
Augsburger Panther players
DEG Metro Stars players
Ilves players
Manchester Monarchs (AHL) players
Michigan Wolverines men's ice hockey players
Reading Royals players
Sioux Falls Stampede players
Vålerenga Ishockey players
HK Acroni Jesenice players
Nottingham Panthers players
USA Hockey National Team Development Program players
American men's ice hockey defensemen
Ice hockey players from Michigan